The 1989 UMass Minutemen football team represented the University of Massachusetts Amherst in the 1989 NCAA Division I-AA football season as a member of the Yankee Conference. The team was coached by Jim Reid and played its home games at Warren McGuirk Alumni Stadium in Hadley, Massachusetts. UMass finished the season with a record of 5–5–1 overall and 3–5 in conference play.

Schedule

References

UMass
UMass Minutemen football seasons
UMass Minutemen football